The Southern Ohio Lunatic Asylum is an historic structure at 2335 Wayne Ave. in Dayton, Ohio. It was added to the National Register of Historic Places on November 15, 1979.

The  complex was designed as a mental asylum in accordance with principles advocated by Philadelphia psychiatrist Thomas Story Kirkbride in the mid-19th century.  It was renamed the Dayton State Hospital and later the Dayton Mental Health Center.

The distinctive main building at the intersection of Wayne and Wilmington avenues is now a retirement center, the hospital farm is now Kettering's Miami Valley Research Park, and other hospital land is now the site of private homes and Hospice of Dayton.

Historic uses 
Health care

See also
 National Register of Historic Places listings in Dayton, Ohio

References

National Register of Historic Places in Montgomery County, Ohio
Buildings and structures in Dayton, Ohio
Psychiatric hospitals in Ohio
1854 establishments in Ohio
Hospital buildings on the National Register of Historic Places in Ohio